The following is a list of Liberty Flames basketball head coaches. There have been eight head coaches of the Flames in their 50-season history.

Liberty's current head coach is Ritchie McKay. He was hired for his second stint as the Flames' head coach in April 2015, replacing Dale Layer, who was fired after the 2014–15 season.

References

Liberty

Liberty Flames basketball, men's, coaches